Redbrick is the student newspaper of the University of Birmingham. Originally titled Guild News, the newspaper was renamed Redbrick in 1962. As with most student newspapers, Redbrick is not fully independent due to funding arrangements, but is editorially independent as is set out in its charter.

Redbrick is written, photographed, edited and published entirely by University students, and is run not for profit, funded by both advertising revenue and the Guild of Students.

About Redbrick 
It consists of News, Comment, Culture, Music, Film, TV, Gaming, Food&Drink, Travel, Life&Style, Sci&Tech and Sport sections.  A sport supplement titled The Lion was published biannually until 2014.

The newspaper is produced fortnightly during term time, with the exception of the summer semester as publication halts during exam season. The newspaper celebrated its 75th birthday in February 2011. The paper is distributed free around campus and the local area every Friday of publication week.

Redbrick's website has grown significantly following a redesign in early 2011. Following the redesign, Redbrick won the Guardian Student Media Award for 'Website of the Year' in 2011.

In December 2018, Redbrick published its 1500th print issue.

History

Early years as Guild News 
Redbrick is one of the oldest student newspapers in the United Kingdom. First published as Guild News on 5 February 1936, its current name dates to 1962. One of three student publications at the university, the others being SATNAV (Science and Technology News and Views) and The Linguist, the paper was originally published alongside the student magazine The Mermaid; this ceased publication.

The newspaper continued to publish throughout the Second World War. The first issue after its declaration featured on its front page an article on the potential difference between The Great War, and the war with Germany in which the country had just become involved.

Redbrick in the late twentieth century 
In summer 1972, following the holding of the Gay Liberation Front's yearly conference in Birmingham by the Guild of Students (the University of Birmingham's students' union), Redbrick published a controversial article titled 'Who's a Wanker?', which described "the practical aspects of homosexuality", then a highly controversial topic. The issue ran out and had to be reprinted. Simultaneously, it was reported to the Press Council because of that article, and it was subsequently withdrawn.

Over the years, Redbrick has covered everything from visits by Prime Ministers, controversial politicians and even Malcolm X. The paper has featured many exposés, reports from behind the Iron Curtain, the 1968 student sit-ins and from behind the scenes at the BBC's first ever Prime Ministerial debate.

Modern-day paper 
One of Redbrick's most successful days so far was its coverage of the 2011 England riots in Birmingham. Redbrick ran a live feed covering the events in Birmingham as they happened, including photography, commentary and a selection of tweets, which attracted over 100,000 visitors in the space of a few hours. Redbrick continued to do this into the second and third days of rioting, and received national recognition for its coverage.

The society has won recognition from various student bodies. In 2005, Redbrick won the most improved society award; following this in 2010 the newspaper won the Guild of Students Most Outstanding Society of the year award. In the same year it won the Outstanding Contribution to Sport award from the University. As previously mentioned, in November 2011, Redbrick also won the Guardian Student Media award for 'Website of the Year'. In 2015, the Sport section of the newspaper was commended for its coverage, winning the Student Publication Association's 'Best University Sports Coverage' award. In 2017, the Redbrick News section won the SPA's 'Best News Story' award for an in-depth investigation into the university's sport clubs' initiations.

In 2014, a funding shortfall caused the newspaper to reduce its publishing frequency from weekly to fortnightly, and its circulation from 3000 per week to 1500 per fortnight.

Editorial team

Redbrick appoints its core editorial team for the coming academic year via simple majority at an annual general meeting in the summer semester. Redbrick encompasses a large team, including writers, editors, designers and managers.

Notable former editors 
Many former editors have gone on to work for national publications, the most notable including Roland Buerk and former Reviews Editor Lizo Mzimba.

References

Redbrick (Newspaper)
Redbrick (Newspaper)
Publications established in 1936
1936 establishments in the United Kingdom